The 2016 United States Women's Curling Championship was held from February 6 to 13 at the Jacksonville Veterans Memorial Arena in Jacksonville, Florida. It was held in conjunction with the 2016 United States Men's Curling Championship.

Teams
There will be seven teams participating in this year's national championship. The teams are listed as follows:

Round robin standings
Final round robin standings

Round robin results

Draw 1
Saturday, February 6, 8:30 pm

Draw 2
Sunday, February 7, 12:00 pm

Draw 3
Sunday, February 7, 8:00 pm

Draw 4
Monday, February 8, 12:00 pm

Draw 5
Monday, February 8, 8:00 pm

Draw 6
Tuesday, February 9, 2:30 pm

Draw 7
Wednesday, February 10, 2:30 pm

Playoffs

1 vs. 2
Thursday, February 11, 4:00 pm

3 vs. 4
Thursday, February 11, 4:00 pm

Semifinal
Friday, February 12, 11:00 am

Final
Friday, February 12, 7:00 pm

Statistics

Perfect games

References

External links

United States National Curling Championships
Women's curling competitions in the United States
Curling in Florida
United States Women's Curling
United States Women's Curling Championship
Curling